Lucas Calviño (born 8 November 1984) is an Argentine former footballer and current goalkeeping coach of Independiente.

Coaching career
On 11 March 2020, Calviño was appointed goalkeeper coach of Colón under newly appointed manager Eduardo Domínguez, who Calviño played together with at Huracán. Manager Domínguez left the club at the end of 2021 together with his staff, including Calviño.

References

External links
 Profile at BDFA
 

1984 births
Living people
Argentine footballers
Argentine expatriate footballers
Gimnasia y Esgrima de Mendoza footballers
Club Almagro players
Club Atlético Huracán footballers
Santiago Morning footballers
Defensores de Belgrano footballers
Atlético Tucumán footballers
Primera B de Chile players
Argentine Primera División players
Expatriate footballers in Chile
Association football goalkeepers